Smolenice is a village and municipality of Trnava District in the Trnava Region of Slovakia, on the foothills of the Little Carpathians. It is 60 km northeast of Bratislava and 25 km northwest of Trnava. The village is made of two parts, Smolenice and Smolenická Nová Ves (formerly Neštich).

History
The location of Smolenice at the edge of the basin of Trnava, easy access, and fertility facilitated settlement of the land in the Paleolithic era. There are only occasional archeological discoveries from this time, however, with more coming from the Neolithic era. The most significant period was the transition between the Bronze and Iron Ages, when the Celts around the 6th century BC had an oppidum above the village. There was a settlement on the same place during the Great Moravia period. From the 10th century it was part of the Kingdom of Hungary. The village was first mentioned in 1256 under name villa Solmus, though the settlement started to grow in the late Middle Ages. In the 14th century, the gothic Smolenice Castle was built above the village, as a part of a chain of fortifications protecting the passes through the Little Carpathians. The castle was royally owned at first, but it changed hands for several centuries until, in disrepair, in 1777 the Pálffys assumed ownership of it. On 28 May, 1704 the battle of Smolenice between the Kurucs and Austrian Imperial army took place. During the Napoleonic Wars, it burned down, and only the outer fortifications remained. In the 20th century, reconstruction of the Smolenice castle ruins began, and was finished in 1953, reconstructed as a château. From 1880 to 1883, Count Jozef Pálffy built a wood processing plant near the nearby village of Majdán. This was replaced in 1968 with the a paint factory Chemolak. On 6 August 2016 Cologne artist Gunter Demnig erected five Stolpersteine for Friedrich Beinhacker and four members of the Sidon family, all murdered by the Nazi regime.

Sights
 The Smolenice Castle, now reconstructed as a château
 Ruins of Celtic oppidum on the Molpír hill.
 The Driny limestone cave, the only publicly accessible cave in western Slovakia.
 Little Carpathians with many castle ruins, with the protected Hlboča valley, and the highest point of the Little Carpathians, Záruby (768 m)
 Grave of Štefan Banič

People
 Štefan Banič, born 1870 in Neštich, inventor of the military parachute.

References

External links
Municipal website 
http://en.e-obce.sk/obec/smolenice/smolenice.html

Villages and municipalities in Trnava District